The 18 kilometre cross-country skiing event was part of the cross-country skiing at the 1928 Winter Olympics programme. It was the second appearance of the event. The competition was held on Friday, 17 February 1928. Forty-nine cross-country skiers from 15 nations competed.

Medalists

Results

References

External links
Official Olympic Report
 

Men's 18 kilometre
Men's 18 kilometre cross-country skiing at the Winter Olympics